His Majesty Must Wait (Swedish: Hans Majestat får vänta) is a 1945 Swedish comedy film directed by Gustaf Edgren and starring Sture Lagerwall, Åke Söderblom and Aino Taube. It was shot at the Råsunda Studios in Stockholm. The film's sets were designed by the art director Nils Svenwall and Arne Åkermark.

Cast
 Sture Lagerwall as 	Kammarjunkare Carl-Johan Stjärna
 Åke Söderblom as 	Frans, hans betjänt
 Aino Taube as 	Eva Linde
 Annalisa Ericson as Irene
 Julia Cæsar as 	Agneta Hermansson
 Hilding Gavle as 	Johan Elof Pireus
 Magnus Kesster as 	Marcus
 Saga Sjöberg as Magda Palmborg
 Katie Rolfsen as Mrs. Palmborg
 Carl Hagman as 	Krusenhielm
 Tord Bernheim as 	Harry Ålund
 Olav Riégo as 	Chamberlain
 Carin Swensson as 	Maid
 Nils Dahlgren as 	Larsson
 Robert Ryberg as 	Policeman
 Charlie Almlöf as 	Waiter på Cecil 
 Margit Andelius as 	Woman at the Boarding House 
 Sven Arvor as 	Man i operapubliken 
 Bertil Berglund as 	Hovmästare 
 Elly Christiansson as 	Evas arbetskamrat 
 Mary Gräber as 	Friherrinna 
 Nils Nordståhl as 	Policeman 
 Gunhild Olson as 	Fröken Svensson 
 Olov Wigren as 	Bekant till Carl-Johan

References

Bibliography 
 Qvist, Per Olov & von Bagh, Peter. Guide to the Cinema of Sweden and Finland. Greenwood Publishing Group, 2000.

External links 
 

1945 films
Swedish comedy films
1945 comedy films
1940s Swedish-language films
Films directed by Gustaf Edgren
Films set in Stockholm
1940s Swedish films